Kirmani or Kermani is a locational surname of Persian origin, which originally meant a person from the city of Kerman, Iran. Notable people with the surname include:

Abu al-Hakam al-Kirmani (died 1066), Andalus philosopher
Afdhal al-Din abu Hamid Kermani (1136–1218), Persian writer
Ali Movahedi-Kermani (born 1931), Iranian politician
Asif Kirmani, Pakistani senator
Auhaduddin Kermani (died 1298), Persian poet
Burhan-ud-din Kermani (died 1449), Persian physician
Faris Kermani (born 1952), Pakistani film director
Hamid al-Din al-Kirmani (died 1021), Persian theologian 
Daud Bandagi Kirmani (born 1513), Sufi Saint of Qadria Order (modern day Pakistan)
Houshang Moradi Kermani (born 1944), Iranian writer
Karim Khan Kermani (1810-1873), Persian scholar
Kazem Sami Kermani (1935–1988), Iranian politician
Khwaju Kermani (1280–1352), Persian poet
Mehdi Sadegh Taghavi Kermani (born 1987), Iranian wrestler
Milad Kermani (born 1992), Iranian football player
Mirza Aqa Khan Kermani (1854–1897), Iranian literary critic
Morteza Kermani-Moghaddam (born 1965), Iranian football player
Muhammad Aqa-Kermani (fl. 1747), Persian physician
Navid Kermani (born 1967), German writer
Sadiq Kirmani (born 1989), Indian cricketer 
Sayed Jaffar (field hockey) (born 1911), Indian Olympian (1932 & 1936 Olympics)
Shams-ud-Din Kermani (died 1384), Persian scholar
Syed Kirmani (born 1949), Indian cricketer
Zaheer Abbas (born 1947), Pakistani Cricketer & President of International Cricket Council

See also
Kermani (disambiguation)
Kerman
List of people from Kerman

Persian-language surnames